This is an alphabetical list of real estate companies of Canada:

B 
 Boardwalk Real Estate Investment Trust
 Brookfield Asset Management

C 
 Cadillac Fairview
 Campeau Corporation
 Canada Lands Company
 Carma Developers
 Cemp Investments
 Chartwell Retirement Residences
 ComFree
 Context Development
 Crombie REIT

D 
 DuProprio
 Dellray Group

E 
 Exit Realty Eastern Ontario www.exiteasternontario.com
 Edper Investments

F 
 Fairchild Group

G 
 Genstar Development Company

H 
 Harvard Developments

I 
 InterRent REIT
 Ivanhoé Cambridge

K 
 KEYreit
 KRP Properties

L 
 Legacy Hotels Real Estate Investment Trust

M 
 Macdonald Realty
 Mainstreet Equity Corp.
 Mattamy Homes
 Menkes
 Minto Group

O 
 Olympia and York
 Onni Group
 Oxford Properties

P 
 Pacific Links International
 Packham International Group Limited
 Parkwestproperties.ca
 Point59 Realty
 PropertyGuys.com
 Propertybuyrent.com

Q 
Quadreal Property Group

R 
 Right at Home Realty
 RioCan Real Estate Investment Trust
 Royal LePage
 Royal Trust (Canada)
 Remax

S 
 Sotheby's International Realty Canada
 Starlight Investments
 Stonehaus Realty Corp

T 
 Tamarack Developments Corporation
 Temple Hotels
 Tridel
 Triple Five Group

References 

companies